Abdoulaye Sall (born 28 December 2000) is a Senegalese footballer who plays as a forward for Italian Serie D club Ghiviborgo.

Career statistics

Club

Notes

References

External links

2000 births
Living people
Senegalese footballers
Association football forwards
Serie C players
Serie D players
A.C.D. Pro Dronero players
Imolese Calcio 1919 players
Senegalese expatriate footballers
Senegalese expatriate sportspeople in Italy
Expatriate footballers in Italy